Joshua Walker may refer to:
 Joshua Walker (MP) (1786–1862), Member of Parliament for Aldeburgh in Suffolk
 Joshua "J.D." Walker (born 1983), songwriter and record producer

See also
 Josh Walker (disambiguation)